In string theory, the dS/CFT correspondence is a de Sitter space analogue of the AdS/CFT correspondence, proposed originally by Andrew Strominger. In this correspondence, the conjectured CFT boundary is in the future, and time is the emergent dimension.

References

External links 
dS/CFT correspondence at the String Theory Wiki

Theoretical physics
String theory
Conformal field theory